Miyama-Zero (みやま零) is the pen name of a Japanese illustrator and artist. Their gender is unknown.

Career
Originally illustrating eroge, Miyama-Zero has since moved on to illustrating light novels and card games, such as Lycèe. They also work under the doujinshi circle name "Stray Moon" (written in English) in which they publish erotic doujinshi. When working as an eroge scenario writer, they operate under the name .

Notable works
 High School DxD – a light novel series that was adapted into an anime; chief illustrator
 The Ambition of Oda Nobuna – a light novel series that was adapted into an anime; chief illustrator
 13cm and Purple software – eroge brands; illustrator for several of their games, such as Princess Bride and Nekonade Distortion

References

External links
 Japanese Wikipedia page
 Official website
 Stray Moon's official website

Japanese illustrators